Casama vilis is a moth of the family Erebidae first described by Francis Walker in 1865. It is found in Sri Lanka, India, Middle East, Ethiopia, Kenya and Somalia.

The caterpillar is known to feed on Acacia catechu and Prosopis cineraria.

References

Moths of Africa
Moths of Asia
Moths described in 1865